Pennsylvania Route 358 (PA 358) is located in Western Pennsylvania, running from the Ohio state line  west of Greenville to Sandy Lake in Mercer County.

Route description

The route continues out of Greenville, and passes near the village of Hadley about  later, and then intersects with US 19 about  after that. About  later, the route passes through the village of Clarks Mills, and then interchanges with I-79  later. PA 358 continues , where it intersects with the north terminus of PA 845 north of Stoneboro, and then the route terminates another  later in the borough of Sandy Lake at the north terminus of the US 62/PA 173 concurrency.

History
In 1928, PA 358 was originally signed from the Ohio state line to Greenville.  The Greenville-to-Sandy Lake alignment was originally signed PA 846 through 1936. The eastern terminus was moved from Greenville to its current location in 1936. In 1954, the eastern terminus was moved back to Greenville.  The Greenville-to-Sandy Lake alignment was signed Alternate US 322 through 1964. In 1964, the eastern terminus was moved back to its current location.

Major intersections

See also

References

External links

Pennsylvania Highways: PA 358

358
Transportation in Mercer County, Pennsylvania
U.S. Route 322